Thomas Greiss (born 29 January 1986) is a German professional ice hockey goaltender for the St. Louis Blues of the National Hockey League (NHL).  Selected 94th overall in the third round of the 2004 NHL Entry Draft by the San Jose Sharks, he has also played for the Phoenix Coyotes, Pittsburgh Penguins, New York Islanders and Detroit Red Wings during his NHL career.

Playing career
Greiss is a native of Füssen, Germany. As a youth, he played in the 1999 Quebec International Pee-Wee Hockey Tournament with a team from Munich. He developed through the youth ranks of EV Füssen before heading to the Kölner Haie organization in 2002. He made his debut in the German top-flight Deutsche Eishockey Liga (DEL) for the Cologne-based team during the 2003–04 campaign.

The San Jose Sharks selected Greiss in the third round, 94th overall, in the 2004 NHL Entry Draft. Greiss played for San Jose during the Sharks' pre-season games ahead of the 2007–08 season, though he was eventually assigned to the team's then-American Hockey League (AHL) affiliate, the Worcester Sharks. On 8 January 2008, he was recalled to replace German compatriot Dimitri Pätzold as the backup goaltender to Evgeni Nabokov. Greiss started his first career NHL game on 13 January 2008, an eventual 4–3 overtime loss to the Anaheim Ducks. For the 2009–10 season, he served as the back-up goaltender to starter Nabokov.

On 12 October 2010, just prior to the commencement of the 2010–11 season, Greiss was put on waivers by San Jose, eventually clearing and reporting to Worcester of the AHL. Greiss' demotion was in large part due to the off-season signings of Finnish goaltenders Antero Niittymäki and Antti Niemi. Nine days later, after failing to see any gameplay as Worcester's third-string goaltender, he was reassigned to Brynäs IF in the Swedish Elitserien to provide him regular playing time. In April 2011, Greiss was recalled from Brynäs to San Jose for the team's run in the 2011 Stanley Cup playoffs. He later re-signed with the Sharks on 7 July.

For the Sharks' 2011–12 season opener, Greiss was the team's starter in a 6–3 win over the Phoenix Coyotes in San Jose. He went on to start the next two games—losses to the Anaheim Ducks and St. Louis Blues—before Antti Niemi returned from off-season surgery. Later in the season, Greiss recorded his first career NHL shutout on 26 January 2013, recording 24 saves in a 4–0 win over the Colorado Avalanche.

Greiss became a free agent in July 2013 and subsequently signed a one-year contract with the Phoenix Coyotes. In his only season with Phoenix, he played in 25 games, posting a 2.25 goals against average (GAA) and .920 save percentage. At the end of the 2013–14 season, he was not re-signed by the Coyotes, whereupon he signed a one-year, $1 million contract as an unrestricted free agent with the Pittsburgh Penguins on 1 July 2014. After the 2014–15 season in which he appeared in 20 games for the Penguins, Greiss once again switched teams as a free agent, signing with the New York Islanders on a two-year, $3 million contract on 1 July 2015. In March 2016, Jaroslav Halák, the Islanders' starting goaltender, suffered a lower-body injury sidelining him six weeks, leaving Greiss as the team's temporary starter.

In December 2016, the Islanders waived Halák, leaving Greiss and Jean-François Bérubé as the Islanders' two goaltenders. On 30 January 2017, Greiss signed a three-year contract extension with the Islanders. On 15 January 2018, Greiss made a career-high 52 saves in a 5–4 overtime win over the Montreal Canadiens.

On 10 October 2020, Greiss signed a two-year, $7.2 million contract with the Detroit Red Wings. Greiss was named the NHL First Star of the Week for the week ending 3 May 2021. He stopped all 66 shots he faced across 130:00 of regulation and overtime. It marked the third time that Greiss had posted consecutive shutouts during his NHL career, and the first time a Detroit goaltender has accomplished the feat since Petr Mrázek did so in January 2018.

On 13 July 2022, Greiss signed as a free agent to a one-year, $1.25 million contract with the St. Louis Blues.

International play
In 2006, Greiss earned a roster spot on the German team for the 2006 Winter Olympics; at just 20 years of age, he was the youngest goaltender in the tournament. During the tournament, Greiss notably recorded an impressive 35-save performance against Canada.

Greiss was again named to the German squad for in the 2010 Winter Olympics in Vancouver.

Greiss represented Germany at the 2017 IIHF World Championship. While at the event, he drew controversy for liking far-right political posts on Twitter, including one comparing Hillary Clinton to Adolf Hitler.

In 2021, the German Ice Hockey Federation (DEB) announced that Greiss would no longer be representing Germany at international events, following Greiss' Instagram posts about the death of controversial conservative radio personality Rush Limbaugh.

Personal life
Greiss' wife Brittney (née Palmer) was Miss South Dakota USA in 2014. Together, they have a daughter.

Career statistics

Regular season and playoffs

International

Awards and honours

References

External links
 

1986 births
Brynäs IF players
Detroit Red Wings players
German ice hockey goaltenders
Hannover Scorpions players
Ice hockey players at the 2006 Winter Olympics
Ice hockey players at the 2010 Winter Olympics
Kölner Haie players
Living people
New York Islanders players
Olympic ice hockey players of Germany
Sportspeople from Füssen
Phoenix Coyotes players
Pittsburgh Penguins players
San Jose Sharks draft picks
San Jose Sharks players
William M. Jennings Trophy winners
Worcester Sharks players